Adm is an abbreviation for the naval rank of admiral.

ADM or A.D.M. may also refer to:

Business 
 Archer Daniels Midland, a food-processing company
 Admiral Group, insurer, Cardiff, Wales, LSE symbol ADM
 Agency debit memo in the travel industry
Aéroports du Mali, airport operator in Mali
 American Dream Meadowlands, a mall in New Jersey, US
 Astra Daihatsu Motor, an Indonesian automotive company

Geography and transport 
 Adisham railway station, Kent, England, station code
 Admiralty MRT station, Singapore, abbreviation
 Admiralty station (MTR), Hong Kong, station code
 , Quebec, Canada
 Ardmore Municipal Airport in Ardmore, Oklahoma, IATA code
 Ardmore station (Oklahoma), Amtrak, station code

Government 
 Assyrian Democratic Movement, Iraq
 , the national authority managing Morocco's expressways

Science, technology and medicine

Biology and medicine
 Abductor digiti minimi muscle of hand
 Adrenomedullin, a vasodilator peptide hormone

Computing and telecommunications
 Adaptive delta modulation, a digital-to-analog data conversion technique
 Add-drop multiplexer, in optical fiber networks
 ADM-3A, a computer terminal manufactured by Lear Siegler
 Administrative Template, in Microsoft Windows Group Policy deployment
 Application development and maintenance in Lean IT
 Architecture Development Method, a component of The Open Group Architecture Framework
 Architecture-driven modernization of legacy software
 Automated decision-making
 Pilot decision making, also known as aeronautical decision-making

Other uses in science and technology
 ADM formalism of general relativity
 Ammonium dimolybdate
 Arrow diagramming method, a network-diagramming technique
 Atomic demolition munition
 Auto Dynamic Metering, Olympus OM-2 camera light metering

Other uses 
 A.D.M. (album), by New Zealand band Snapper, 1996
 ADM (Amsterdam), a former squat in the Port of Amsterdam
 Additional district magistrate, a civil service officer in India, below district magistrate
 Adel–De Soto–Minburn Community School District, in Adel, Iowa, US

See also
 AD/M-19 (Alianza Democrática M-19), a Colombian political party
 ADM-Aeolus, an ESA satellite